A sentient weapon is a common plot device in many works of fantasy, mythology, and science fiction, and is related to the classic motif of the magic sword. Sentient weapons may be human, robotic, or magical (as is the case with any non-technological weapons, such as a sword), but not all magic weapons are sentient. A sentient weapon may experience a moral conflict from its specific nature as a weapon, or may function as the villain, which, through its intelligence, is able to gain power. Another possibility is that it assists the wielder, or is merely neutral.

In fantasy and mythology
 Kullervo's Sword from the Kalevala
 Anglachel – The Silmarillion
 Stormbringer – The Elric Saga
 Nightblood – Warbreaker (a.k.a. Sword Nimi – The Stormlight Archive)
 Kazid'hea – The Legend of Drizzt
 Need – The Oathbound and subsequent novels

In film 
 Skynet and Terminators – Terminator

In video games
 Grimoire Weiss – Nier
 Aigis – Persona 3
 Master Sword – The Legend of Zelda: Skyward Sword/Breath of the Wild.
 Eyelander – Team Fortress 2
 Transistor – Transistor
 Soul Edge and Soul Calibur – Soulcalibur series
 Umbra – Elder Scrolls series
 Lilarcor – Baldur's Gate II
 The weapons in Boyfriend Dungeon
 Modwyr – Pillars of Eternity II: Deadfire
Caliburn – Sonic and the Black Knight

In anime
 Senketsu - Kill la Kill
 Several characters in the Soul Eater series
 Derflinger – The Familiar of Zero
Several characters in the Wakfu series

See also
Magic sword
List of fictional robots and androids

Fantasy tropes
Fantasy weapons
Science fiction weapons
Mythological weapons